My Little Pony: Equestria Girls, known simply as Equestria Girls or EQG (sometimes as Through the Mirror), is a 2013 Flash animated fantasy musical movie which is the first installment of Hasbro's toy line and media franchise of the same name, which is itself an anthropomorphized spin-off of the 2010 relaunch of the My Little Pony franchise. The movie was directed by Jayson Thiessen and written by Meghan McCarthy and was produced by DHX Media's 2D animation studio in Vancouver, Canada for Hasbro Studios in the United States. It premiered at the Los Angeles Film Festival on June 15, 2013, followed by limited release in the United States and Canada on June 16, 2013, with a home media release on August 6, 2013. It also commemorates the thirtieth anniversary of the launch of the original My Little Pony toy line.

The movie re-envisions the main characters of the parent franchise, normally ponies, as teenage human characters in a high school setting. Set between the third and fourth seasons of My Little Pony: Friendship Is Magic, the movie's plot involves Twilight Sparkle pursuing her stolen crown into an alternate world where she transforms into a human teenage girl. While learning how to behave like a human, Twilight encounters human counterparts of her pony friends, who help her in her search for her crown.

The movie's critical reception was mixed, with most criticism directed towards character design, writing, plot, and characterization. The movie was followed by three sequels, My Little Pony: Equestria Girls - Rainbow Rocks (2014), My Little Pony: Equestria Girls - Friendship Games (2015) and My Little Pony: Equestria Girls - Legend of Everfree (2016) – all of which were more positively received.

Plot 

Twilight Sparkle visits the Crystal Empire for her first royal summit following her coronation as a princess of Equestria. Sunset Shimmer, a former student of Princess Celestia, emerges from a mirror portal and steals Twilight's crown, which contains the Element of Magic. After a chase through the castle, Sunset goes through the portal with Twilight's crown. The other princesses explain that the portal leads to an alternate world; as the other Elements of Harmony are unusable without the crown, Twilight is tasked with retrieving it from the other world before the portal closes for thirty moons. Despite Celestia's insistence that Twilight must travel alone, Spike follows her into the portal.

Twilight and Spike emerge in the other world in the form of a human teenager and a dog, respectively. Twilight investigates the nearby Canterlot High School and encounters its human students and staff, several of whom resemble ponies in Equestria. Masquerading as a transfer student, Twilight defends the counterpart of her friend Fluttershy from being bullied by Sunset. Twilight learns that Fluttershy has delivered the crown to Principal Celestia, mistaking it for a prop meant for the elected "princess" of the Fall Formal. Determining that no one would believe her claims of being a pony from another world, Twilight receives Celestia's permission to run for Fall Formal Princess against Sunset to recover the crown.

While continuing to explore school life, Twilight discovers that the counterparts of Fluttershy and her other friends from Ponyville (Pinkie Pie, Applejack, Rarity and Rainbow Dash) – have separated of hostility. Sunset sends her cohorts Snips and Snails to record a humiliating video of Twilight behaving like a pony, which is posted online and viewed by the entire school. The counterparts of Twilight's friends come to her aid, only to argue among themselves, revealing the cause of their falling out to be a series of treacherous text messages and emails they supposedly sent each other. Through a theory of Twilight's, however, the five girls realize that Sunset sent these messages to deceive them. The five reconcile and help Twilight perform a public dance routine for her campaign, which improves Twilight's image.

In another attempt to undermine Twilight, Sunset has the formal decorations in the school gym wrecked and uses edited photographs to frame Twilight. Although Sunset's ex-boyfriend Flash Sentry proves Twilight's innocence, the formal is postponed to the night after the portal to Equestria closes. Twilight and Spike reveal their true identities to the other girls, convincing them of the situation's urgency. Under Twilight's direction, they rally the other students and successfully repair the damage in time for its original schedule, earning Twilight the school's support.

On the night of the formal, Twilight wins the election and the crown, but Sunset steals it back in a scuffle after kidnapping Spike and threatening to destroy the portal to Equestria. Upon donning the crown, Sunset transforms into a demon and hypnotizes the other students, revealing her intent to conquer Equestria with the students as her army. When Sunset attacks Twilight and her friends, their friendship activates the crown's magic, giving them pony-like ears, wings, and tails. The six girls use magic to revert Sunset and their schoolmates to normal. Sunset, humbled by the power of the girls' friendship, tearfully apologizes for her actions. After celebrating at the formal and placing Sunset under her friends' care, Twilight and Spike return to Equestria with the crown as the portal closes, reuniting with their pony friends.

Cast

 Tara Strong as Princess Twilight Sparkle
 Ashleigh Ball as Applejack and Rainbow Dash
 Andrea Libman as Pinkie Pie and Fluttershy
 Tabitha St. Germain as Rarity and Vice Principal Luna / Princess Luna
 Cathy Weseluck as Spike
 Rebecca Shoichet as Sunset Shimmer
 Lee Tockar as Snips
 Richard Ian Cox as Snails
 Nicole Oliver as Principal Celestia / Princess Celestia and Cheerilee
 Vincent Tong as Flash Sentry
 Britt McKillip as Princess Cadance

Singers
 Rebecca Shoichet as Princess Twilight Sparkle
 Shannon Chan-Kent as Pinkie Pie
 Kazumi Evans as Rarity

Production 

To maintain continuity, Hasbro used the same writing staff as Friendship Is Magic television series, including the then-current story editor Meghan McCarthy, who considered the story to be "an extension of our mythology". McCarthy stated that with the Equestria Girls setting, "we might explore different aspects of relationships that in the pony world don't quite work the same as they do when you set it in a high school setting", thus making the work more appealing to older girls that are in high or junior high school.

In writing the movie's script, McCarthy went back to the self-titled two-part pilot episode of Friendship Is Magic, where Twilight is sent to Ponyville for the first time and forced to meet new friends. She wanted to do the same with the movie, in this case putting Twilight into a new world where she would again be forced to make new friends and succeed in her quest.

Music 

Daniel Ingram stated in a Facebook post that he wrote six songs for the movie in a more modern pop/girl group style that would fit the high school/urban setting. He also mentioned some of the crew members with whom he worked, including Trevor Hoffman for vocal arrangements and David Corman and Sam Ryan for production and that he collaborated with McCarthy on the lyrics.
 "This Strange World" – Twilight Sparkle (voiceover)
 "Equestria Girls (Cafeteria Song)" – Mane Six and students
 "Time to Come Together" – Mane Six (voiceover)
 "This Is Our Big Night" – Mane Six (voiceover)
 "This Is Our Big Night (Reprise)" – Mane Six (voiceover)
 "End Credits Song: A Friend for Life" – Jerrica Santos
 "My Little Pony Friends" (Deleted Song) – Kaylee Johnston, AJ Woodworth, and Laura Hastings The song was written to serve as the end credits to the movie, but was passed over in favor of "A Friend for Life". On August 14, 2014, the song was uploaded to Hasbro's YouTube channel.
 
Composer William Anderson, who provided the score for the movie, said that most of the background music remains consistent with the television show, though "with elements of thrash rock once in a while".

Release

Marketing 
On May 12, 2013, a teaser trailer was first released on the New York Times website, followed by a full theatrical trailer on Entertainment Weekly's website on June 7, 2013.

Theatrical 
My Little Pony: Equestria Girls premiered at the Los Angeles Film Festival on June 15, 2013, as part of its Family Day. The event included appearances by several of the show's creative staff and voice actors. It was then presented under limited screen distribution, with total of around 200 screens, through Screenvision and Cineplex theaters across the United States and Canada respectively, starting on June 16, 2013. Due to a larger-than-expected number of theater-goers in the initial weeks, Screenvision added additional showings to take advantage of the interest. The screenings in the United States bore no classification from the MPAA (which is not mandatory, although many theaters carried a G-rating), while the Canadian screenings had classifications from provincial movie boards (usually G).

The movie was re-released in select theaters across the United States on June 18 and 19, 2016 by distributor company Kidtoon Films.

In the United Kingdom, it was released through Showcase Cinemas on August 10, 2013. It was released at Village Cinemas in Australia on August 24, 2013. It was released in New Zealand through Event Cinemas for two weeks starting August 31, 2013.

Home media 
The movie was released on Region 1 DVD and Blu-ray by Shout! Factory on August 6, 2013. The Blu-ray release includes a behind-the-scenes documentary on: the movie's production, karaoke songs, a "ponify yourself" video and a printable movie poster. Shout! Factory has signed with Hasbro to distribute the movie internationally after its theatrical run.

The Region 4 DVD was released by Madman Entertainment on September 4, 2013. The Region 2 DVD and Blu-ray was originally advertised to be released by UK distributor Clear Vision in April 2014, but the distributor had since entered administration. However, the same UK distributor did manage to release a Region 2 DVD for France and Italy between March and April 2014. The UK version DVD and Blu-ray was eventually released on July 28, 2014.

Alongside Rainbow Rocks and Friendship Games, this movie was released in a box set on October 13, 2015 in Region 1.

Television 
The movie made its United States television premiere on the Hub Network (a joint venture between Discovery Communications and Hasbro; now known as Discovery Family as of late 2014) on September 1, 2013. On September 22, 2013, the movie premiered on YTV in Canada. In the United Kingdom, the movie premiered on Pop on November 23, 2013.

Merchandise and other media 

The movie is a part of My Little Pony: Equestria Girls toy line and media franchise launched by Hasbro, which was briefly mentioned in the media earlier in February and March 2013 and formally announced in May 2013 with this movie and other media strategy. It was to be part of the 30th anniversary of the My Little Pony brand. Hasbro planned to produce related merchandise including: toys, apparel, publishing and accessories. The human-based toys were developed to appeal to girls in their teens as a means to extend the My Little Pony brand. In addition, LB Kids published a novelization of the movie and Gameloft included a themed mini-game in its My Little Pony mobile game. IDW published a backstory of the characters in the alternative universe (including Sunset Shimmer) in a stand-alone issue.

Soundtrack 
The movie's soundtrack was released on September 23, 2014, via the ITunes Store. "This Strange World" is absent in the album. On October 2, 2014 (chart of October 11), the soundtrack placed #15, where the "My Little Pony Equestria Girls: Rainbow Rocks" soundtrack was two weeks ago on September 18.

Reception

Media sales 
Upon release to home video, Shout! Factory reported that more than 100,000 units have been ordered at retail, the largest release that the company has seen in its ten-year history. As a result of the success, Hasbro has signed Shout to continue distribution of other out-of-print My Little Pony titles from earlier generations such as The Princess Promenade, as well as newer animated Transformers shows.

Television viewership 
My Little Pony: Equestria Girls premiered on the Hub Network on September 1, 2013. The movie was viewed by 553,000 viewers. It earned year-to-year delivery time gains among multiple demographics, most notably Girls 6-11 (+1056%). In the United Kingdom, 93,000 viewers watched the television broadcast on Pop, the most for the week of November 18–24.

Critical response 

There has been criticism over the anthropomorphism approach of the franchise overall (including the movie). The New York Daily News reported that, while some feared allowing their children to be influenced by the looks of humanized characters, others considered it reasonable with other current media with considerable body exposure. Slate's Amanda Marcotte considered that the characters' change to human form was to popularize the movie with the adult fanbase of Friendship Is Magic. However, many of these adult fans expressed disappointment over the humanized characters, worrying that the approach "goes against everything that Pony was trying to prove". Craig McCracken, speaking for his wife Lauren Faust, Friendship Is Magics creative showrunner for the first two seasons before stepping down, expressed concern that such approach would have gone against the way Faust wanted to take the television series.

The movie itself received mixed reviews from critics. Daniel Alvarez of the website Unleash the Fanboy gave the movie 4 stars out of 5, stating that Equestria Girls was a "highly entertaining movie", though some elements, such as the brief romantic plot and Sunset's ultimate fate, were weaker than other parts of the movie. Luke Thompson of Topless Robot was more critical of the movie, as while not a viewer of Friendship Is Magic, he believed "whatever clever concepts the show may have [...] the movie does not do very much with" and considered the animation sub-standard for a TV-to-movie adaptation. Iowa State Daily described the movie as one that was "probably just made to sell dolls and figurines", though still delivered a "great message for kids". Gwen Ihnat of The A.V. Club rated the film a "B−" and considered that the movie "is only a few songs and one amazing demon battle scene better than most of [[My Little Pony: Friendship is Magic|Friendship Is Magic'''s]] two-part episodes", while otherwise treading on clichéd ideas from both the Friendship Is Magic and from other teen high school works. Sherilyn Connelly of SF Weekly, though having enjoyed the movie, felt it was too similar to the television series's pilot episodes in how the characters needed to be re-introduced for the movie audience and that the "real disconnect" was the apparent reduction of age, from young adult in Friendship Is Magic to teenagers within the movie. Connelly did, however, vote for the movie as Best Animated Feature in the 2013 Village Voice Film Critics' Poll. Ed Liu of Toon Zone (now known as Anime Superhero) considered that the movie "relies a bit too much on the familiar and the conventional", lacking Friendship Is Magics injection of "idiosyncratic character" into otherwise predictable plots, but otherwise praised the voice actors, music and some of the movie's animation.

 References 

 Further reading 
 Guthrie, Dana. "My Little Pony reboot turns plastic horses into teenage girls". Houston Chronicle''. Monday, June 17, 2013.

External links 

 
 
 

My Little Pony: Equestria Girls
2013 films
English-language Canadian films
2013 computer-animated films
2010s musical comedy films
2010s fantasy adventure films
2010s musical fantasy films
2010s American animated films
2010s children's animated films
American flash animated films
American children's animated adventure films
American children's animated fantasy films
American children's animated musical films
American fantasy adventure films
Canadian animated feature films
Canadian animated fantasy films
Canadian children's fantasy films
Canadian musical fantasy films
Equestria Girls films
Films about parallel universes
Films about princesses
Films about shapeshifting
Film spin-offs
Demons in film
Hasbro Studios films
American musical fantasy films
Films about unicorns
Films directed by Jayson Thiessen
DHX Media films
Magical girl films
Portal fantasy
2010s English-language films
2010s Canadian films